The Morgan-Bedinger-Dandridge House — first known as Poplar Grove, then Rosebrake or Rose Brake — is part of a group of structures affiliated with the Morgan's Grove rural historic district near Shepherdstown, West Virginia.  The property was known as "Poplar Grove" until 1877.

History
The original building on the site was built around 1745 by settler Richard Morgan (ca. 1700–1763) and became known as the "Back Building". In 1803 the house was expanded by Daniel Morgan with a two-story brick structure, known as the "Great House".  Formal gardens were added at this time.

In 1859 the present main portion of the house was built by Caroline Bedinger, widow of Henry Bedinger. During her ownership the house was occupied by Colonel Alexander R. Boteler, a former U.S. Representative who, at the outbreak of the American Civil War became a Confederate officer.  After the war, while Boteler was living at Poplar Grove, President U.S. Grant appointed Boteler to the U. S. Centennial Commission.

Caroline's daughter, Danske Bedinger Dandridge, a noted poet, changed the name of the house to "Rosebrake" (sometimes spelled "Rose Brake") in 1877.

A portico was added to the house in 1950, removed from a house on Long Island and shipped to West Virginia.

See also 

 The Bower
 Chestnut Grove (plantation)

References

External links

 ("Rose Break" or "Dandridge House")

American Civil War sites in West Virginia
Bedinger family
Neoclassical architecture in West Virginia
Dandridge family of Virginia
Georgian architecture in West Virginia
Houses completed in 1745
Houses completed in 1859
Houses in Jefferson County, West Virginia
Houses on the National Register of Historic Places in West Virginia
Historic American Buildings Survey in West Virginia
Jefferson County, West Virginia in the American Civil War
National Register of Historic Places in Jefferson County, West Virginia
Individually listed contributing properties to historic districts on the National Register in West Virginia
Morgan family of West Virginia
1745 establishments in Virginia